Lake Tislit is a lake located in Morocco's Haut Atlas Oriental National Park, in the administrative division of Imilchil. This is an "agdal" (which means "proprietary grazing field" in the Berber language) where the tribes of Ayt Ḥdiddu lead their flocks during the summer. The lake has been designated as a protected Ramsar site since 2005.

Every year in September, a significant festival is held at the lake.

References

Lakes of Morocco
Ramsar sites in Morocco
Geography of Drâa-Tafilalet